This is a list of Gothic artists.

 Mastro Guglielmo  12th Century Italian Sculptor
 Maestro Esiguo  13th Century
 Master of the Franciscan Crucifixes 13th Century Italian
 Benedetto Antelami  1178–1196 Italian Sculptor
 Bonaventura Berlinghieri  1215–1242 Italian Painteiiii
 Nicola Pisano 	1220–1284 	Italian Sculptor
 Fra Guglielmo 	1235–1310 	Italian Sculptor
 Guido Bigarelli 	1238–1257 	Italian Sculptor
 Giovanni Pisano 	1250–1314 	Italian Sculptor
 Duccio di Buoninsegna 1255–1318    Italian Painter
 Lorenzo Maitani 	1255–1330 	Italian Sculptor/Architect
 Arnolfo di Cambio 	1264–1302 	Italian Sculptor
 Arnau Bassa               14th Century    Spanish Painter
 Master of San Francesco Bardi 	14th Century 	Italian Painter
 Master of San Jacopo a Mucciana 	14th Century 	Italian
 Ferrer Bassa      1285–1348       Spanish Painter
 Simone Martini 	1285–1344 	Italian Painter
 Tino da Camaino 	1285–1337 	Italian Sculptor
 Evrard d'Orleans 	1292–1357 	French Sculptor
 Andrea Pisano 	1295–1348 	Italian Sculptor
 Jacopo del Casentino 	1297–1358 	Italian Painter
 Segna di Buonaventure 	1298–1331 	Italian Painter
 Giovanni da Balduccio 	1300–1360 	Italian Sculptor
 Jean Pucelle      1300–1355  French Manuscript Illuminator
 Goro di Gregorio 	1300–1334 	Italian Sculptor
 Gano di Fazio 	1302–1318 	Italian Sculptor
 Vitale da Bologna 	1309–1360 	Italian Painter
 Agostino di Giovanni 	1310–1347 	Italian Sculptor
 Allegretto Nuzi 	1315–1373 	Italian Painter
 Giottino 	1320–1369 	Italian Painter
 Giusto de Menabuoi 	1320–1397 	Italian Painter
 Puccio Capanna 	1325–1350 	Italian Painter
 Theodoric of Prague       ?–1381  Czech Painter
 Altichiero 	1330–1384 	Italian Painter
 Bartolo di Fredi 	1330–1410 	Italian Painter
 Peter Parler 	1330–1399 	German Sculptor
 André Beauneveu 	1335–1400 	Netherlandish Painter/Sculptor
 Master of the Dominican Effigies 	1336–1345 	Italian Painter
 Niccolo di Pietro Gerini 	c. 1340–1414 	Italian Painter
 Guariento di Arpo 	1338–1377 	Italian Painter
 Jacobello Dalle Masegne 	?–1409  	Italian Sculptor
 Giovanni da Campione 	1340–1360 	Italian Sculptor
 Master of the Rebel Angels 	1340–1345 	Italian Painter
 Andrea da Firenze 	1343–1377 	Italian Painter
 Nino Pisano 	1343–1368 	Italian Painter/Sculptor
 Puccio di Simone 	1345–1365 	Italian Painter
 Nicolo da Bologna 	1348–1399 	Italian
 Bonino da Campione 	1350–1390 	Italian Sculptor
 Lluís Borrassà 	1350–1424 	Spanish Painter
 Jacquemart de Hesdin      1350–1410      French Miniaturist
 Giovanni da Milano 	1350–1369 	Italian Painter
 Master of the Rinuccini Chapel 	1350–1375 	Italian
 Claus Sluter 	1350–1406 	Flemish Sculptor
 Giovanni Bon 	1355–1443 	Italian Sculptor/Architect
 Melchior Broederlam 	1355–1411 	Netherlandish Painter
 Giovanni del Biondo 	1356–1399 	Italian Painter
 Pere Serra                1357–1406       Spanish Painter
 Gherardo Starnina 	1360–1413 	Italian Painter
 Jean de Liege 	1361–1382 	Flemish Sculptor
 Taddeo di Bartolo 	1362–1422 	Italian Painter
 Jean Malouel 	1365–1415 	Netherlandish Painter
 Gentile da Fabriano 	1370–1427 	Italian Painter
 Lorenzo Monaco 	1370–1425 	Italian Painter
 Stefano da Verona 	1375–1438 	Italian Painter
 Pere Oller   1394–1442    Spanish Sculptor   
 Master of Saint Veronica 	1395–1420 	German Painter
 Bernat Martorell  Died 1452       Spanish Painter
 Fra Angelico 1395–1455  	Italian Painter
 Jacopo Bellini 	1400–1470 	Italian Painter
 Pere Johan   c. 1400     Spanish Sculptor       
 Hermann Jean and Paul Limbourg 	1400 	Netherlandish Manuscript Illuminator
 Master of the Passion of Christ	15th-century	Swedish Painter
 Master of the Berswordt Altar 	1400 	German Painter
 Upper Rhenish Master  fl. c. 1410–1420  German Painter
 Jacomart          1410–1461       Spanish Painter
 Meister Hartmann fl. c. 1417–1428  German Sculptor
 Jaume Huguet      1412–1492       Spanish Painter
 Henri Bellechose 	1415–1440 	Flemish Painter
 Jörg Syrlin the Elder c. 1425–1491  German Sculptor
 Jörg Syrlin the Younger c. 1455–152 German Sculptor
 Master of Schloss Lichtenstein  fl. c. 1430–1450   Austrian Painter
 Bernt Notke    c. 1435–1508       German  Sculptor and Painter
 Albertus Pictor  c. 1440–1507  German Painter (active in Sweden)
 Niklaus Weckmann c. 1481–1526  German Sculptor
 Daniel Mauch c. 1477–1540  German Sculptor
 Michel Erhart c. 1440-45–after 1522  German Sculptor
 Jan Polack          Polish-German  Painter
 Nicolaus Haberschrack          Polish Painter
 Jan Goraj          Polish Painter
 Jordan Painter fl. c. 1470–1480 Swedish Painter
 Master of the Drapery Studies fl. c. 1470−1500 German Draughtsman and Painter
 Gil de Siloé  c. 1450–1501          Spanish Sculptor
 Veit Stoss    c. 1450–1533          German Sculptor
 Hermen Rode   fl. c. 1468–1504     German Painter
 Henning von der Heide c. 1460–1521  German Sculptor
 Cola Petruccioli 1362–1408 Triptych Painter

Gothic art
 
Gothic artists